The  was a centrist political party in Japan.

History
The party was established on 8 March 1947 as a merger of the Cooperative Democratic Party and the National Party following seven months of talks. The merger was the result of fears that a new electoral system would make it more difficult for small parties to gain representation. Although it initially had 78 MPs, a group of 15 led by Heima Hayashi left to join the Democratic Party.

In the 1947 elections the party won 31 seats in the House of Representatives and nine in the House of Councillors. It joined Tetsu Katayama's coalition government and was given two cabinet positions; party chairman Takeo Miki was appointed Minister of Communications and Junzo Sasamori Minister in charge of the Demobilisation Agency. When Hitoshi Ashida formed a new government in 1948, the NCP remained in the coalition, with Okada Seiichi and Funada Kyōji appointed to the cabinet.

In early 1948 three MPs left to form the Social Reformist Party, and the party left the government when Ashida resigned later in the year. The 1949 elections saw the party reduced to 14 seats. In May 1949 it merged with the New Farmers' Party, the Social Reformist Party and several small parliamentary factions to form the New Politics Council.

In February 1950 the party was briefly re-established when several former party MPs left the New Politics Council, but in April 1950 it merged with the New Politics Council and the Democratic Party to form the National Democratic Party.

Election results

House of Representatives

References

Cooperative parties
Defunct political parties in Japan
Political parties established in 1947
1947 establishments in Japan
Political parties disestablished in 1949
1949 disestablishments in Japan
Political parties established in 1950
1950 establishments in Japan
Political parties disestablished in 1950
1950 disestablishments in Japan